Coleophora aporiella is a moth of the family Coleophoridae.

External links

aporiella
Moths described in 1989